"Stand by My Woman" is a song recorded by American singer Lenny Kravitz and released on September 2, 1991, as the fourth single from his second studio album Mama Said. The song was later included as a track on his 2000 album Greatest Hits.

Critical reception
Christopher A. Daniel of Albumism said "Stand By My Woman" is "one of the album’s more remorseful moments, allowing Kravitz to be vulnerable over gospel-inspired pianos and organs." Greg Kot of the Chicago Tribune wrote, "As demonstrated on "All I Ever Wanted" and "Stand by My Woman", Kravitz is particularly fond of John Lennon's Plastic Ono Band phase, in which Phil Spector's echo-laden production inflated the sparest instrumentation-simple snare beats, bell-like piano chords-around gut-wrenching vocals." Elysa Gardner of Rolling Stone stated, "Prince – a musician whose penchant for producing and playing various instruments Kravitz shares and a singer whose whisper-to-a-scream vocal style he adopts for urgent numbers like "Stand by My Woman". Caroline Sullivan from Smash Hits deemed it "a slow, serious one." She added, "This is all brooding and emotional and you can just see Len furrowing his brow as he sings. It's not as immediately catchy as the last one, but repeated listenings make you feel like you're doing something educational and mind-improving. Sort of."

Music video
The accompanying music video was directed by Lisa Bonet, his then wife, and Paul Boyd, and was included in Kravitz's first video album Video Retrospective released in 1991. The video should feature young actress Angelina Jolie but her footage was reportedly cut out. Kravitz told Us Weekly magazine, "Angelina Jolie auditioned for the lead in my Stand by My Woman video. The director passed!"

Track listing

Charts

References

External links
 

1991 singles
1991 songs
Lenny Kravitz songs
Music videos directed by Paul Boyd
Songs written by Lenny Kravitz